The King of Dahomey (Ahosu in the Fon language) was the ruler of Dahomey, an African kingdom in the southern part of present-day Benin, which lasted from 1600 until 1900 when the French Third Republic abolished the political authority of the Kingdom. The rulers served a prominent position in Fon ancestor worship leading the Annual Customs and this important position caused the French to bring back the exiled king of Dahomey for ceremonial purposes in 1910. Since 2000, there have been rival claimants as king and there has so far been no political solution.  The Palace and seat of government were in the town of Abomey.  Early historiography of the King of Dahomey presented them as absolute rulers who formally owned all property and people of the kingdom.  However, recent histories have emphasized that there was significant political contestation limiting the power of the king and that there was a female ruler of Dahomey, Hangbe, who was largely written out of early histories.

The first king
Multiple lists of the kings of Dahomey have been put together and many of them start at different points for the first King of Dahomey. In various sources, Do-Aklin, Dakodonu, or Houegbadja are all considered the first king of Dahomey.  Oral tradition contends that Do-Aklin moved from Allada to the Abomey plateau, Dakodonu created the first settlement and founded the kingdom (but is often considered a "mere chief"), and Houegbadja who settled the kingdom, built the palace and created much of the structure is often considered the first king of Dahomey. Oral tradition contends that the kings were all of the Aladaxonou dynasty, a name claiming descent from the city of Allada which Dahomey conquered in the 1700s.  Historians largely believe now that this connection was created to legitimate rule over the city of Allada and that connections to the royal family in Allada were likely of a limited nature.  In oral tradition of most accounts, Houegbadja is considered the first king and recognition of him happened first in the Annual Customs of Dahomey.

List of kings

(Dates in italics indicate de facto continuation of office)

Sources:

See also
History of the Kingdom of Dahomey
Royal Palaces of Abomey
Benin
Fon
Fon states
Rulers of the Fon state of Alada (Allada)
Rulers of the Fon state of Savi Hweda
Lists of office-holders

References

Dahomey
Kingdom of Dahomey
Kings of Dahomey